Erm is predominantly an Estonian language surname. As of 2019, there are 237 men and 256 women in Estonia with the surname Erm and it is ranked as the 219th most common surname for men and the 234th surname for women in Estonia. The surname is the most common in Rapla County. Individuals bearing the surname Erm include: 

 Andreas Erm (born 1976), German race walker
 Elisabeth Erm (born 1993), Estonian model
 Johannes Erm (born 1998), Estonian decathlete
 Liivi Erm (born 1953), Estonian sport shooter and coach
 Tõnis Erm (born 1982), Estonian mountain bike orienteer

As a given name
Erm Lund (1914–2003), Estonian weightlifter

References

Estonian-language surnames